Étrépilly is the name of two communes in France:

 Étrépilly, Aisne, in the Aisne département
 Étrépilly, Seine-et-Marne, in the Seine-et-Marne département